La sospecha (English title: Suspicion) is a Mexican telenovela produced by Televisa and transmitted by Telesistema Mexicano.

Carlos López Moctezuma and Patricia Morán starred as protagonists.

Cast 
Carlos López Moctezuma
Patricia Morán
Tony Carbajal
Eduardo Fajardo
Aurora Alvarado
Nicolás Rodríguez

References 

Mexican telenovelas
1961 telenovelas
Televisa telenovelas
1961 Mexican television series debuts
1961 Mexican television series endings
Spanish-language telenovelas